Amina Titilayo Atiku-Abubakar (born 6 June 1951) is a Nigerian advocate of women and child rights and one of the wives of former vice president of the Federal Republic of Nigeria, Atiku Abubakar. She is the founder of Women Trafficking and Child Labour Eradication Foundation (WOTCLEF) and the initiator of the private bill that led to the establishment of National Agency for the Prohibition of Trafficking in Persons (NAPTIP).

Early life and education
Titilayo Albert was born into a Christian home to the Albert family, a Yoruba family from Ilesa, Osun state. She was raised in Lagos and had her primary education in Lafiaji, Lagos then proceeded to St. Mary's Iwo, Osun state for her secondary education up until 1969. In 1971, she married Atiku Abubakar, then a young customs officer, before attending Kaduna Polytechnic. Apart from English, she speaks Yoruba and Hausa languages fluently. She converted from Christianity to Islam.

Career and advocacy
She was a lecturer at Kaduna State Polytechnic.

While in Rome to further her education in 1986 and 1987, she saw many Nigerian girls on the street. After making inquiry, she realized that many of the girls served as prostitutes for their madams, and quite often were not paid. She also found out that they were deceived with promises to work in Italy, and this prompted her to pledge to combat such incidences upon her return.

WOTCLEF & NAPTIP 
In 1999, when her husband, Atiku Abubakar became Nigeria's vice president, she started an advocacy to end forced prostitution and other forms of human trafficking.

First, she founded Women Trafficking and Child Labour Eradication Foundation (WOTCLEF), and then sponsored a private bill for strict punishment for traffickers, and for the establishment of a federal agency, the National Agency for Prohibition of Trafficking in Persons, responsible for fighting trafficking of persons in Nigeria. She also ran education courses focused on welcoming and rehabilitating girls repatriated from different countries back home to Nigeria.

Titi Atiku Abubakar Wife of the presidential candidate of the people Democratic Party (PDP) 2023,says she wanted to become the first Yoruba woman as Nigeria First Lady since 1999.
Titi also repeated "I still want to be the First Lady of  Nigeria Country in 2023
Speaking During her interview with BBC Yoruba ,she asked Yoruba people to support her husband's candidacy. 

Hajiya Titi also said she will never stop her Humanitarian works if her husband  becomes the New Elected President of Nigeria on February 25 2023
She said her Organization for Women Trafficking and Child Labour Eradication Foundation (WOTCLEF) Sponsored the bill that led to the Establishment of National Agency for the Prohibition of Trafficking in Person (NAPTIP) in 2023 since the inception of the civilian government in 1999, no Yoruba person has become the First Lady of the Country. 
Titi Said Atiku is my husband .we have been together for 50years. 
My husband wants to give back  to the Country   owing to what the Country had done for him. BBC Yoruba

Awards
 Annual Nigerian Women's Award (2002)
 D'linga Award (2010)

Publications
Amina Titi Abubakar is the author of a number of publications including:
Educating the Nigerian Child 
Empower Law to Fight Child Slavery
Let Us Celebrate Humanity: A collected speeches on women's right and human trafficking

See also
 Atiku Abubakar
 Oluwaseun Osowobi

References

Living people
Anti–human trafficking activists
Nigerian women in politics
Nigerian former Christians
Nigerian Muslims
Converts to Islam from Christianity
1951 births
Yoruba women in politics
Kaduna Polytechnic alumni
Yoruba women activists
Nigerian women activists
People from Ilesha
Politicians from Lagos